Catalina may refer to:

Arts and media 
 The Catalina, a 2012 American reality television show
 Catalina (novel), a 1948 novel by W. Somerset Maugham
 Catalina (My Name Is Earl), character from the NBC sitcom My Name Is Earl
 Catalina, Space Cases character played by Jewel Staite
 Catalina, a character in the video games Grand Theft Auto: San Andreas and Grand Theft Auto III
 "Catalina", a song from the album Only Built 4 Cuban Linx... Pt. II by Raekwon
 "Catalina", lead single from the 2017 album Los ángeles by Rosalía
 "Catalina", a song from the 2012 album Allah-Las by Allah-Las

Organizations
 Catalina Sky Survey, a NASA project aiming to identify potentially hazardous asteroids (PHAs)
 Catalina Swimwear, a former swimwear line for the Pacific Mills clothing company
 Catalina Yachts, a boat manufacturer
 Santa Catalina Monastery, a cloistered convent located in Arequipa, Peru

People 
 Catalina (name), including a list of people with the name
Santa Catalina, or Catherine of Palma (1533–1574), Spanish saint
 India Catalina, indigenous Calamari princess kidnapped by the Spanish conquerors near Cartagena de Indias
 Lucius Sergius Catalina, often anglicized as Catiline, an Ancient Roman politician

Places 
 Catalina, Arizona
 Cătălina (disambiguation), various places in Romania
 Catalina, Covasna, Romania
 Santa Catalina, Ilocos Sur
 Santa Catalina, Negros Oriental
 Catalina, Newfoundland and Labrador, Canada
 Santa Catalina Mountains
 Archipelago of San Andrés, Providencia and Santa Catalina
 Any of several islands:
 Santa Catalina Island (California), United States
 Santa Catalina Island (Colombia)
 Catalina Island (Dominican Republic)
 Catalina Park, a race track in Katoomba, Australia

Science and technology

 Tomcat Catalina, the Jakarta Tomcat version servlet container since Tomcat 4.x
 Anthocharis cethura catalina, the Catalina Orangetip, a subspecies of Desert Orangetip butterfly only found on Santa Catalina Island
 Catalina (beetle), a genus of rove beetles in the subtribe Perinthina
 C/2013 US10, an Oort cloud comet, also known as Catalina
 macOS Catalina, a desktop computer operating system by Apple released in 2019

Vehicles 
 Avid Catalina, an American flying boat homebuilt aircraft design
 Consolidated PBY Catalina, the US Navy designation for an American and Canadian-built flying boat
 Fly Synthesis Catalina, an Italian ultralight flying boat
 Pontiac Catalina, a full-size Pontiac model from the 1950s to the 1980s
 SS Catalina, a 1924 steamship for passenger transport between Los Angeles and Santa Catalina Island
 Sailboats made by Catalina Yachts

Other uses 
 Catalina affair, an incident on June 13, 1952, that led to a crisis in Swedish–Soviet relations
 Catalina dressing, a tomato-based salad dressing

See also 
 Santa Catalina (disambiguation)
 Catilina, Roman politician from the 1st century BC